Canterbury railway station may refer to:

Canterbury railway station, Melbourne, in Victoria, Australia
Canterbury railway station, Sydney, in New South Wales, Australia
Canterbury East railway station in Kent, UK
Canterbury West railway station in Kent, UK